Grant Turner''' may refer to:

Grant Turner (footballer) (1958–2023), New Zealand association footballer
Grant Turner (radio host), hosted Grand Ole Opry'' radio program 1944-91
Grant Turner (swimmer), British swimmer